Cat dancer may refer to:
Omaha the Cat Dancer
Cat Dancers, an HBO documentary